Buzz!: The Mega Quiz released as Buzz! The Maha Quiz in India was developed by Relentless Software and is the fourth game in the Buzz! series for the PlayStation 2, alongside Buzz! Junior: Robo Jam. Buzz! The Mega Quiz has over 5,000 questions. Along with Buzz! Junior: Jungle Party, this was one of the first Buzz games released in North America, also the first game in the series to have a 12+ rating by PEGI.

Rounds

Multiplayer Rounds

Point Picker
A little similar to Point Builder in the other Buzz! games, in that it is usually the first round, but players can choose the question topic.

Winner Stays On
In this round a question is asked and two pictures are also shown, once all the players have answered those who answered the question incorrectly are eliminated and the others are given points, this repeats until the questions have been asked four times or one or fewer players remain.

Fastest Finger
Exactly the same as the namesake round in other Buzz! games. Players are given a question and the fastest player who gets it right, gets the most points. Second, third, and fourth places get fewer points, no points can be lost in this round.

Pie Fight
An improvement from Hitman in Buzz!: The Big Quiz. Answering a question correctly first gives the player a chance to throw a pie at a fellow contestant. In addition, players can take two hits before they're out instead of three.

Mystery Challenge
Halfway through the game a mystery challenge comes on. It is a random selection from several games. These include horse racing, where players simply choose one of the four horses to win a race, the result of which is random; duck shoot, where 4 rows of ducks are to be "shot" using the 4 coloured buttons on the controller; and "find the lady", like the famous street-corner scammers' game, 3 cards are dealt then quickly shuffled, players have to keep track of the Queen card.  Another game is "Fact or Fiction", where the host reads a statement and the players must choose if the statement is True or False.

Globetrotter
Is a similar round to Buzz!'s world of sport in Buzz!: The Sports Quiz, except players get to pick the location they want to go to if they answer the question correctly the fastest.

Top Rank
Players are asked a question and then asked to press down the buttons in the right sequence to get the question right. This round is similar to Who Wants to be A Millionaire's Fastest Finger round.

Point Stealer
In this round, answering the question correctly first gives the player a chance to steal points from an opponent of their choice.

Final Countdown
Buzz takes all of the players' points and converts them into time. The higher the score, the more time a player will start this round with. Players then continue to answer questions until only one player remains. This player is then declared the winner.

As soon as the question is read, the time column starts going low. Players are required to answer questions as quickly as possible. Whenever the player gets a question wrong, they lose a chunk of their time. But if the player answers a question correctly, they can stop their time until the next question. The fastest player to answer correctly also receives a bonus time. Once the player's time column repletes completely, they're eliminated.

Single Player Rounds

Time Builder
In this round the player has 10 seconds to answer a question. If the player answers correctly, the remaining time will go towards use in the Hotseat. If the player answers incorrectly, he or she will receive no time at all.

Hotseat
Using the time earned in Time Builder, the player must answer questions. If answered correctly, the player will climb a point ladder.

Banking Points
Similar to The Weakest Link, In the Hotseat when the player climbs the ladder he can either press the buzzer to bank the points, or continue, giving the player more than double the previous number on the ladder. If the player however gets a wrong answer with points on the ladder, he/she will lose those points.

Reception
Rob Fahey in Eurogamer praised the quality and difficulty level of the questions, and the game rounds, except for the mystery rounds which he felt were random with their awarding of points and weren't much fun. Other than that he said that the balancing of the rounds and questions was arguably close to perfection and scored it as 9/10.
Aaron Thomas from GameSpot liked that way the game isn't just a race to see who can regurgitate a memorised answer quickly, but actually forces you to use knowledge in different ways and scored the game as 7.5/10.

References

External links
 U.S. Website
 Buzz! official site
 Sleepydog Ltd
 Relentless Software

2007 video games
PlayStation 2 games
PlayStation 2-only games
EyeToy games
Buzz!
Video games developed in the United Kingdom
Multiplayer and single-player video games
Relentless Software games
Sony Interactive Entertainment games

sv:Buzz!#Spel